La Ronge Water Aerodrome  is located adjacent to La Ronge, Saskatchewan, Canada.

See also 
List of airports in Saskatchewan
La Ronge (Barber Field) Airport

References 

Registered aerodromes in Saskatchewan
Seaplane bases in Saskatchewan